Nebria decatrai is a species of ground beetle from Nebriinae subfamily that is endemic to Tibet.

References

decatrai
Beetles described in 1996
Beetles of Asia
Endemic fauna of Tibet